Álvaro Sebastián Sánchez Burgos (born 4 April 1989) is a Uruguayan footballer who plays as a midfielder. He is currently a free agent.

Career
Sánchez started his career in the ranks of local club Tacuarembó. He began featuring for them in the 2008–09 Primera División season, which he ended with his first senior goal after netting against Villa Española on 8 February 2009. Tacuarembó were relegated two seasons later in 2010–11, with Sánchez subsequently scoring seven goals across three campaigns in the Segunda División which culminated with promotion back to the top tier as 2013–14 champions. Sánchez left the club midway through 2014–15.

Career statistics
.

Honours
Tacuarembó
Segunda División: 2013–14

References

External links

1989 births
Living people
People from Tacuarembó
Uruguayan footballers
Association football midfielders
Uruguayan Primera División players
Uruguayan Segunda División players
Tacuarembó F.C. players